Des chiffres et des lettres ("numbers and letters") is a French television programme. It was created by Armand Jammot and tests the numeracy skills and vocabulary of two contestants. It is one of the longest-running game shows in the world, and the inspiration for Countdown on Britain's Channel 4.

The game debuted in 1965 as Le mot le plus long using letters only, and reached its present format in 1972. It is currently transmitted on France 3 after 39 years first on Antenne 2 and then France 2. It has been hosted since 1992 by Laurent Romejko, Arielle Boulin-Prat, and Bertrand Renard. The former two check words proposed by the contestants and Renard provides solutions to the number problems the contestants fail to solve. Renard was hired on the show at the age of 19, after having won as a contestant in 12 consecutive matches. The show is seen throughout the world on TV5Monde including TV5 Québec Canada throughout Canada.

Rules
Two contestants play against one another. As the title of the game indicates, it is based on two skills: numeracy and literacy.

In the television version, there are also "duels". These are speed problems for which only the first player to provide the correct answer receives points. Both contestants may receive points in solving the other problems. Finally, there is a game called "sprint final" where the contestants have to be the fastest to solve the two final rounds.

The winner of a match is the first player to win two games or a player who wins the opening game by 50 points or more.

Each show is made up of 16 problems presented in three sections. The first and second sections consist of two letter problems and two numbers problems played alternatively and followed by a duel. The third round consists of two letter problems and two numbers problems played alternatively and followed by the final sprint. If the players are tied at the end of the program a buzzer question is used to break the tie.

Winners can remain on the show for up to 10 consecutive matches.

Numbers round
The goal of this round is to arrive at a chosen number (from 101 to 999) using the four basic arithmetic operations (+, -, ×, ÷) applied to six numbers chosen randomly from the following alternatives: 1 to 10; 25; 50; 75; 100 (each number is drawn from the entire set, so the same number may appear more than once). Once these six numbers are selected, a three-digit target number is generated. The players have 40 seconds to combine the numbers arithmetically (add/subtract/multiply/divide) with the goal of producing the target number. The contestants may use each of the six numbers originally selected once, and the result of each operation performed with them once – for example, if a contestant multiplies 4 by 25 to obtain 100, he or she may no longer use the 4 or 25, but may use the 100 in further calculations. The contestants are not required to use all six numbers, and must obtain only positive integers as a result of any step.

Example
Numbers given:
8 4 4 6 8 9

Target number:
594

  8 + 8 = 16
 16 × 4 = 64
  6 − 4 = 2
 64 + 2 = 66
 66 × 9 = 594

Or

  8 × 8 = 64
 64 − 4 = 60
 60 + 6 = 66
 66 × 9 = 594

Contestants signal that they have obtained the target number by saying le compte est bon. Ten points are awarded to each contestant who arrives at the target number exactly or, if the number cannot be reached (as checked by a computer), to each contestant reaching the closest possible number. If neither contestant obtains the best solution possible, the contestant or contestants with the result nearest the target number receive seven points each.

Numbo
In 1987 Daniel Defays implemented a computer program called "Numbo" which uses probabilistic parallel processing to model human performance in the game Le compte est bon.

Letters round
In this round, one contestant is asked how many vowels s/he would like to be used in a randomly-generated 10-letter selection (each chosen unseen from all possible vowels or consonants). Specific letters may be drawn multiple times. The game used 7 letters originally, before steadily increasing to 8, and later 9 until 4 April 2010. Contestants previously selected letters alternatively by asking for a vowel or consonant one-by-one.

The goal is to find the longest word using the available letters. The players have 30 seconds to study the board and find a word. The contestant with the longest word scores one point per letter; both score in the event of a tie (the same word, or words of equal length). If a contestant tries a longer word that is not in the programme's dictionaries, his or her word is rejected, but his or her opponent may score the points for its length by giving a shorter, valid word. For example, if a contestant produces a nine-letter word that is rejected and his or her opponent produces an acceptable word that is shorter, the opponent gains nine points. If both words are incorrect, no one scores. Diacritics do not count: for instance, the French word épeler (to spell) will be formed with the tiles E P E L E R.

Example
 With the following letters:

T O C E D A M I T S

it is possible to get the French words dictats, amodies and mastoïde.
 With the following letters:

R U R E T E C E R Z

it is possible to get the French words recruter and érecteur.

Duels
There are several variations of the "duel" section:
 the classic version, which consists of finding two words on the same theme after 10 letters have been given, using each letter once and only once,
 "l'un dans l'autre" ("one within the other"): with ten given letters, find a ten-letter word and another word, within the first; one a proper noun, the other a common noun,
 "la bonne orthographe" (the "correct spelling"): a word is proposed and the winner is the one who spells this word correctly first,
 "le calcul mental" ("mental arithmetic"): the players must complete a calculation (for example, 24 × (32 − 5 × (42 ...)) in their heads.

Only one answer is accepted, from the first player to provide one. If the answer is correct, ten points (originally five points) are awarded to the player giving it. If the answer is incorrect, the player's opponent receives three points.

Before the regular letters and numbers rounds, a toss-up duel is played, with the winner earning a "sesame," or joker, that can be used in the final bonus game (introduced in 2016).

Final sprint 
At the end of the game, the contestants play the "final sprint" where they have to solve two problems. As opposed to the other rounds during the game (except duels), these have been generated prior to the show and they admit at least one perfect solution (either a 10-letter word or a number that can be found with the 6 given numbers) the contestants must find as fast as possible. As in duels, only one answer is accepted, from the first player to provide one. If the answer is correct, five points are awarded to the player giving it. If the answer is incorrect, the player's opponent receives three points.

Each contestant, starting from the lowest-scored one, chooses which kind of problem they want to play with : numbers or letters.

Les mots de la fin 
This round was introduced in 2016 along with a new set for the show. Only the winning contestant plays this round, and they have two minutes to find the longest word possible in 8 different 10-letter selections. The length of the longest word is given for each selection. Each correct answer is worth €100. The contestant may pass and move on to the next selection, and the selections are cycled until the time expires or all eight have been solved.  If the contestant has a joker earned from the opening duel, they may call for it, and the word is automatically counted as a correct answer.

The maximum possible winnings a contestant can achieve is €9,000.

International versions
Legend:
 Currently airing or returning
 No longer airing
 Non-broadcast pilot

Australian version

An Australian version, called Letters And Numbers (the literal translation of the original), commenced airing on SBS on 2 August 2010. It was hosted by Richard Morecroft. It closely followed the gameplay of the UK version, albeit with a slightly more modern set (with subtly animated background), but the clock, manual letterboards and whiteboard for the maths problems were all present. In the course of the show there were 5 letter rounds, 3 number rounds and a final Conundrum round. The winners of each show carried over to the next episode (up to a maximum of 6 episodes, upon which they must retire), whilst the runner-up went home with a Macquarie dictionary. SBS "retired" the show in June 2012 and replaced it with the British version of the program, Countdown (not to be confused with the Australian music show of the same name).

Danish version
The Danish version was called Stav et tal (spell a number) and aired on DR.

Dutch version
Cijfers en Letters was broadcast in the Netherlands by public broadcasting organisation KRO from 1975 until 1988. Hosts were Han van der Meer, Maartje van Weegen, Robert ten Brink and Bob Bouma.

Flemish version
Cijfers en Letters was broadcast in Flanders on the Flemish commercial television channel VTM from 1989 until 1993. Host of the show was former radio host and DJ Jackie Dewaele, also known as Zaki. Assists were Walter De Meyere and Carine Van de Ven.

Greek version
The Greek version of the game show, Grámmata kai Arithmoí, debuted 13 February 1976 on ERT1 with television host Christos Oikonomou. This version was televised until 28 December 1981.

On Monday 20 November 1989, Mega Channel produced a new version of Grámmata kai Arithmoí with television host Kostas Papadonopoulos, but this was cancelled after 19 February 1990 after 15 episodes, as Papandonopoulos' schedule had more-important obligations and the producers were unable to find a replacement host.

Italian version
Paroliamo is the name of the Italian version of the game, aired by Telemontecarlo and Rai Due for ten seasons.

South African version
The South African version was called "A Word or 2", and aired on SABC2, from 1998–2008, hosted by Jeremy Mansfield. It followed a similar format to the UK version.

In the letters game, there were three stacks of consonants and vowels. Like in the French version, contestants picked alternately, but the person to begin the round also got to choose which of the three stacks was used for the round.

During the word games, both contestants score regardless of whether it's the winning word or not. During the numbers games, only the closer answer scores.

The winner of each game earned R1000, and returned for another game. The runner-up won a dictionary and the home game. The ultimate winner won a R40,000 laptop, while the runner-up won a R10,000 PC.

Spanish version
The Spanish TV show Cifras y letras (Numbers and Letters) is another adaptation of Des chiffres et des lettres on TVE 2. Originally presented by Elisenda Roca as of 1991, with a lavishly artistic designed studio and the music for each round being extracted from classical music, a movie soundtrack or similar. There are four rounds consisting of a number game followed by two letter games. Between the second and third round there is a duel that consists of finding two words on the same theme from the nine letters provided.

Points:
 Words are worth one point per letter, but a nine-letter word is worth double; that is, 18 points.
 The correct sum gets 9 points.
 The duel is worth 10 points. Just like the French show, only one answer is accepted, but if the answer is wrong the other player gets 10 points.

The winner wins 100,000 pesetas (€602) and gets to play again the next day. If the game is tied, they both get to play again the next day and each player wins 50,000 pesetas (€301).

Swedish version
The Swedish version was called Tänk till tusen, and aired on SVT1 from 21 December 1985 until 21 May 1988. It was hosted by Ulf Wickbom.

Turkish version
Bir Kelime Bir İşlem which means "One word, one operation" is the name of the Turkish version of the game, aired by TRT.

Yugoslavian version

Brojke i slova is the name of the Yugoslavian version of the game, produced by the TV center Zagreb for airing on the common Yugoslavian network JRT. The show used the Serbo-Croatian language and ran throughout the 1980s.

UK version

The first UK version of the series was broadcast on Yorkshire Television who commissioned a series of eight shows under the title Calendar Countdown, which were to be a spin-off of their regional news programme Calendar. As the presenter of Calendar, Richard Whiteley was the natural choice to present. These shows were only broadcast in the Yorkshire area.   The current long-running United Kingdom series Countdown began in 1982, on Channel 4 but still made by Yorkshire Television.  It is a close adaptation of the same format, The main differences are that the rounds last only 30 seconds instead of 45, only one contestant chooses the letters in each round and the "duels" are replaced with the "Countdown Conundrum", a nine-letter anagram.

The style of presentation is notably (and deliberately) more old fashioned, and prides itself on featuring no computerised elements whatsoever, other than a random number generator for the numbers round. Whereas contestants on Des Chiffres Et Des Lettres use computer touchscreens to register their words / number solutions, Countdown contestants use pen and paper. Unlike Des Chiffres Et Des Lettres computerised displays, Countdowns letters and numbers are displayed on boards, with the time limit being measured using a huge clock face at the back of the set, as opposed to a bar gradually filling in. The clock, and the music played during rounds, have become icons of the UK show.

No major prizes are offered, with winners receiving a dictionary, a home version of the game, and a special Countdown teapot depicting the show's clock face. The winner of each series receives a leather-bound complete set of the Oxford English Dictionary. The low-tech and low-budget nature of the production is a subject of numerous jokes within the programme.

U.S. version
An unsold pilot for a U.S. version titled Countdown was filmed on 18 September 1990 hosted by Los Angeles Radio personality Michael Jackson, announced by Charlie O'Donnell, and produced by the Guber-Peters Company (successor to Barris Industries now owned by Sony Pictures Television)

Main game
Two teams, each with one celebrity (Heather Thomas & Woody Harrelson) competed in a series of rounds involving forming words from a series of nine letters.

Letter tiles are arranged face-down into two piles; one all consonants, the other vowels. The contestant picks a pile, and Jackson reveals the top tile from that pile and places it on the board. A selection of nine tiles is generated in this way, and must contain at least three vowels and four consonants. Then, the clock is started and both contestants have 30 seconds to come up with the longest word they can make from the available letters. Each letter may be used only as often as it appears in the selection.

Both team members write down the words they have found during the round, in case they have the same one. The players may confer, but each player comes up with an individual word and shows them Match Game style at the end of the 30 seconds. After the 30 seconds are up, the players declare the length of their chosen word, with the player who selected the letters declaring first. If either player has not written their word down in time, he/she must declare this also. The words are then revealed. If either player has not written their word down, that is revealed first; otherwise, the shorter word is shown first. The teams score one point for each letter in both words, up to a maximum of 18. If a contestant offers an invalid word then they score no points. If the second player reveals the same word as the first, this must be proved by showing the word to the other contestant. Finally, two word authorities (Tony Pandolfo, Lori Huggins) reveal the best word they could find from the selection, aided by the production team.

The team with the most points after three rounds wins the game and goes on to the bonus round.

Bonus round
The team has 45 seconds to solve seven scrambled words (four, five, six, seven, seven, eight and nine letters long). All words had something in common, like "At the Movies". The celebrity was allowed to assist. Getting each word was worth $200 and all seven words were worth $10,000.

As in the 80s versions of Pyramid, two games are played with the contestants switching celebrities for game two. The player with the most money from the bonus round returned the next day. If there was a tie, both players returned the next day.

References

French game shows
Countdown (game show)
1960s French television series
1965 French television series debuts
1960s game shows
1970s game shows
1980s game shows
1990s game shows
2000s game shows
2010s game shows